Hibbertia tricornis is a species of flowering plant in the family Dilleniaceae and is only known from a three specimens collected in Arnhem Land in the Northern Territory. It is a small, more or less prostrate shrublet with a few delicate, wiry branches, elliptic leaves and yellow flowers arranged singly in leaf axils with 19 to 24 stamens arranged in groups around two densely scaly carpels.

Description

Taxonomy
Hibbertia tricornis was first formally described in 2010 by Hellmut R. Toelken in the Journal of the Adelaide Botanic Gardens from a specimen collected by Clyde Robert Dunlop on Mount Brockman on the edge of the Arnhem Land escarpment in 1978. The specific epithet (tricornis) means "three-horned", referring to the bract and outer sepal lobes.

Distribution
This hibbertia is only known from three specimens collected from the type location where they were growing between rocks in woodland.

Conservation status
Hibbertia tricornis is classified as "vulnerable" under the Northern Territory Government Northern Territory Government Territory Parks and Wildlife Conservation Act 1976.

See also
List of Hibbertia species

References

tricornis
Flora of the Northern Territory
Plants described in 2010
Taxa named by Hellmut R. Toelken